Armando González Sandoval (born 13 July 1997) is a Mexican professional footballer who plays as a winger.

Career
González made his professional debut at the age of 16.

References

External links
 
 
 Armando González Sandoval at Sub-20 Stats 

1997 births
Living people
Mexican footballers
Association football wingers
Atlético Morelia players
Coras de Nayarit F.C. footballers
Atlético Zacatepec footballers
Footballers from Nayarit
Sportspeople from Tepic, Nayarit